Roll is the seventh studio album by Canadian country music group Emerson Drive. It was released on October 30, 2012 via Open Road Recordings. The album's first single, "She's My Kind of Crazy," reached the top forty on the Canadian Hot 100.

Roll was nominated for Country Album of the Year at the 2013 Juno Awards. It was also nominated for Album of the Year at the 2013 Canadian Country Music Association Awards.

Track listing

Chart performance

Album

Singles

References

2012 albums
Emerson Drive albums
Open Road Recordings albums